Kenny Jenkins, better known by his stage name Diverse, is an American rapper. An underground hip hop artist, he has received critical acclaim "from knowledgeable heads worldwide".

Career
Diverse got his start in the Chicago hip-hop scene while being employed at a post office.

He has worked or associated with Chicago hip-hop mainstays such as J.U.I.C.E., Modill, and Iomos Marad. His debut EP, Move, featuring the track "Time", appeared in 2001. He has professional relationships with RJD2 and Prefuse 73. He contributed to Prefuse 73's album One Word Extinguisher, rhyming on the track "Plastic". Prefuse 73 also produced the original beat for "Wylin' Out," a track that paired Diverse with the beloved New York City rapper Mos Def. The single "Wylin' Out" was well-received, with remixes by Definitive Jux's RJD2 and K-Kruz, and included on the 2002 Urban Renewal Program compilation. Both Prefuse 73 and RJD2 contributed tracks to Diverse's 2003 debut full-length, One A.M. Prefuse 73's contributions were the ambient-flavored beats for "Jus Biz", "Leaving", and the interlude "Amberglis". 

Two of Diverse's songs from his One A.M. album, "Blindman", produced by K-Kruz, and "Explosive (Caural Mix)," were featured on the soundtrack of Capcom's 2006 game Final Fight Streetwise for the PlayStation 2 and the Xbox. Also featured on the soundtrack was "Wylin' Out (RJD2 Remix)" with Mos Def. The song "Certified" was also featured in Tony Hawk's Underground 2. In the same year, Diverse was featured on the track "Gray Scale" by Montreal-area DJ Ghislain Poirier.

In 2005, Diverse teamed with a Detroit-based crew called Lawless Element, appearing on a track called "...Something."

Summer 2006 saw Diverse participate in The Storm Tour, travelling across North America with headliner Aceyalone, Ugly Duckling, Mayday!, and Wrekonize. Diverse's setlist drew heavily from the still unreleased album and mixtape. In June 2006, Diverse was featured on the Chocolate Swim EP, a collaboration of Chocolate Industries and Cartoon Network's Adult Swim.  On the six-track EP, Diverse appeared on a Kut Masta Kurt remix of "Wylin' Out" with Mos Def and a DJ Mitsu The Beats remix of his song "Ain't Right".

Diverse's second album will be called Round About. The few published progress reports on it have indicated the continued contributions of Madlib, K-Kruz, and Prefuse 73 and also involvement from Oh No, Sa-Ra Creative Partners, Hezekiah, and the late J Dilla.

Slated to precede the release of Round About is The Standard, a mixtape comprising snippets from Round About, exclusive content, rare works, little-heard remixes, previously unreleased songs, and, chiefly, covers of songs considered "standards" or "classics" of the hip-hop genre. Standards: The Mixtape was released in 2006.

Style and influences
Diverse cites Mos Def, Pharaohe Monch of Organized Konfusion, and Posdnuos of De La Soul as his three main influences.

Discography

Albums
 One A.M. (2003)
 Round About (TBA)

Mixtapes
 Standards (2007)

EPs
 Move (2001)

Singles
 "Certified" b/w "Build" (2002)
 "Wylin Out" (2002) with Mos Def and Prefuse 73
 "Explosive" (2003)
 "Jus Biz" (2004)
 "Big Game" (2004)
 "Escape Earth (The Moon)" (2008)

Guest appearances
 Prefuse 73 - "Plastic" from One Word Extinguisher (2003)

Compilation appearances
 "Wylin Out (Kut Masta Kurt Remix)" on Chocolate Swim (2006)

References

External links
 Diverse at Chocolate Industries
 Diverse on Myspace
 

African-American male rappers
Living people
Rappers from Chicago
Year of birth missing (living people)
21st-century American rappers
21st-century American male musicians
Quakers (band) members
21st-century African-American musicians